The Women's 15 kilometre individual biathlon competition at the 2006 Winter Olympics in Turin, Italy was held on 13 February, at Cesana San Sicario. Competitors raced over five loops of a 3.0 kilometre skiing course, shooting twenty times, ten prone and ten standing. Each miss resulted in one minute being added to a competitor's skiing time.

Anna Bogaliy-Titovets won at this track at the pre-Olympic trial event in 2005, when she finished in a time of 50:47.9 with one penalty minute, while Andrea Henkel was the defending World and Olympic champion. Henkel had not won a 15 km World Cup race apart from these two wins in the Championships, however, and Sweden's Anna Carin Olofsson was the World Cup leader before the Games.

Russia's Olga Pyleva originally placed second in the race, but was found to be in violation of anti-doping rules when she tested positive for carphedon, and she was then disqualified.

Results 
The race was held at 12:00.

References

Women's biathlon at the 2006 Winter Olympics